Richard "Younglord" Frierson (born July 9, 1978) is an American Grammy-nominated hip hop and R&B record producer.
In 2014, Frierson founded The Truth Licensing. A major provider of music for Films, TV shows, and commercial ads.

Career
A native of New York City, he was signed in November 1994, at the age of sixteen, to Puff Daddy's Hitmen Production Team  producing for the label's roster including Mase, The Lox, Faith Evans and 112. He has since produced for outside acts such as Virtue, DMX, Lloyd Banks, Veronica, New Edition and Consequence. Most recently his success was with the Diddy comeback single "Come to Me", which reached Number 9 on The U.S. Billboard Hot 100 Singles Sales co-produced by Yakubu "Jai" Izuagbe also known as Rebel.

Frierson: The Talent Scout
Frierson was also partly responsible for the now infamous producer Ryan Leslie's meeting with P. Diddy after Leslie was given a 30-day contract as a music production intern for Frierson. When the two producers created the Beyoncé Knowles song "Keep Giving Your Love To Me" for the Bad Boys 2 soundtrack, Ryan was asked to meet P. Diddy.

Frierson conceptualized an incubator system for artists, allowing creative space for growth for up and coming artists and producers. Finding such talent such as Terry "MaddScientist" Thomas (a pseudonym inspired by Nicole Scherzinger's single "") and Atozzio, he helped guide and prepare them up to the point where they would be able to sign a publishing deal with EMI Music Publishing.

Identifying and supporting burgeoning artists has been a crucial factor for Frierson. After speaking at lectures at Berklee College of Music, Frierson met Keith Harris, guiding him to LA, where he eventually became Production Partner for Black Eyed Peas' Will I Am, working on two of the last Black Eyed Peas albums, and also working on Estelle's hit single, "American Boy". Chris Henderson, another talent under Frierson's wings, went on to write the hit record "Blame It" by Jamie Foxx, and has written for R&B hit man R. Kelly.

License To Rock
In 2014, Frierson founded The Truth Music Licensing . The Truth controls a catalog of over 5,000 songs and has licensed music to major movie studios, networks, and high-profile brands.

License To Rock is the rebranding of The Truth Music Library. This rebranding consists of a major expansion and a partnership with a high profile music label. These changes put LTR in position to build a massive catalog and become a dominant force in the licensing space. Some of License To Rock's placements have been with Mona Scott's "Love & Hip Hop" franchises, Lee Daniels' "STAR" & "EMPIRE" and commercials for brands including Gatorade, Pepsi, and AT&T.

Discography

1990s

1997: Puff Daddy – No Way Out
1997: Mase – Harlem World
1997: Big Pun – You Ain't A Killer
1997: Soul in the Hole soundtrack
1997: Big Pun – Caribbean Connection
1997: The Notorious B.I.G.- Hypnotize
1998: Big Pun – Capital Punishment
1998: Fat Joe – Don Cartagena
1998: Faith Evans – Keep The Faith
1998: 112 – Room 112
1998: The Lox – Money, Power, Respect
1999: Tash – Rap Life
1999: Black Rob – I Dare You

2000s

2000: Lil Kim – The Notorious K.I.M.
2000: Big Pun – Yeeeah Baby
2000: Big Pun – It's So Hard
2000: Girlfight Soundtrack
2000: LL Cool J – Leave It On The Floor (Gatorade Commercial)
2001: Fat Joe – J.O.S.E.
2001: Fat Joe – He's Not Real
2002: Grand Theft Auto: Vice City
2002: LL Cool J – Big Mama Remix
2002: Kool G Rap –  The Giancana Story
2003: LL Cool J – 10
2003: Loon – Loon
2003: Beyoncé – Keep Giving Your Love To Me
2003: Bad Boys Soundtrack
2004: New Edition – One Love
2004: Virtue – Nothing But The Hits
2004: Pitch Black Law
2005:  Ginuwine – Back II da Basics
2006: Diddy – Press Play
2006: Lloyd Banks – Gilmore's
2006: Diddy – Come To Me
2006: Lloyd Banks – Rotten Apple
2006: Blowin Up: The Album
2007: Consequence – Don't Quit Your Day Job
2007: Cheri Dennis –  In And Out Of Love
2007: Paula DeAnda – Easy
2008: Dem Franchise Boyz – Our World, Our Way
2009: Notorious (Original Soundtrack)

2010s
2010: Big Tunes: Destination Dance

References

External links
Younglord on Myspace
Younglord discography at Discogs
Younglord at RateYourMusic
Younglord at AllMusic

Discographies of American artists
1978 births
Living people
Businesspeople from New York City
African-American musicians
American rhythm and blues musicians
African-American record producers
East Coast hip hop musicians
American hip hop record producers
Record producers from New York (state)
21st-century African-American people
20th-century African-American people